Camassia scilloides is a perennial herb known commonly as Atlantic camas, wild hyacinth, and eastern camas. It is native to the eastern half of North America, including Ontario and the eastern United States.

Description 
The flowers have light blue or whitish tepals and yellow anthers. The green or brown capsule is up to a centimeter long and divided into three parts.

Uses 
Native American groups used the bulbs for food, eating them raw, baked, roasted, boiled, or dried. They can be used in place of potatoes, but could possibly be confused for poisonous deathcamas.

Taxonomy 
The superseded name Camassia esculenta (Ker Gawl.) B.L.Rob., (nom. illeg.) should not be confused with Camassia esculenta (Nutt.) Lindl., a superseded name for Camassia quamash subsp. quamash.

References

External links

Camassia scilloides. USDA PLANTS
Jalava, J. V. 2013. Recovery Strategy for the Wild Hyacinth (Camassia scilloides) in Ontario. Ontario Recovery Strategy Series. Ontario Ministry of Natural Resources, Peterborough.

Agavoideae
Flora of North America
Plants described in 1818